The Embassy of Armenia in Washington, D.C. is the diplomatic mission of Armenia to the United States, located near Embassy Row in Washington, D.C. The embassy is located at 2225 R Street, NW in the Sheridan-Kalorama neighborhood.

After declaring independence in 1991, Armenia established diplomatic relations with the United States and opened its embassy in February 1993 with the arrival of Ambassador Rouben Shugarian. The current ambassador, Lilit Makunts, was appointed in August 2021.

Ambassadors

Ambassadors of Armenia to the United States:
Lilit Makunts (2021–present)
Varuzhan Nersesyan (2018–2021)
Grigor Hovhannissian (2016–2018) 
Tigran Sargsyan (2014–2016)
Tatul Margaryan (2005–2014) 
Arman Kirakossian (1999–2005) 
Ruben Shugarian (1993–1999)
Alexander Arzumanyan (1992–1993)

Building history
Designed by local architect George Oakley Totten, Jr. in 1909, the Mediterranean Revival style building originally served as the residence of Amaryllis Gillett. Subsequent owners included Congressman Gilbert M. Hitchcock and the International Institute of Interior Design (IIID). After the IIID merged with Marymount University in 1990, the property remained vacant until it was purchased by the Armenian government in 1995. The $2.3 million purchase of the structure and its later renovations were paid for in part by substantial donations from the Armenian American community. The 2009 property value of the Armenian embassy is $3,675,890.

See also

Armenia–United States relations
Armenian American Political Action Committee
Armenian Assembly of America
Armenian National Committee of America
Embassy of the United States, Yerevan
Foreign relations of Armenia
List of diplomatic missions of Armenia

References

External links

 Embassy website
 Wikimapia

Houses completed in 1909
Government agencies established in 1993
Houses in Washington, D.C.
Armenia
Washington, D.C.
Armenia–United States relations
Sheridan-Kalorama Historic District